West Pine is a locality and small rural community in the local government area of Central Coast, in the North West region of Tasmania. The 2016 census determined a population of 138 for the state suburb of West Pine.

Road infrastructure
The B17 route (Pine Road) runs from the Bass Highway through the eastern part of locality, from where it provides access to many other localities further south. The C116 (West Pine Road), C117 (Cuprona Road), and C118 (Daveys Road) routes all traverse parts of the locality and also provide access to the south.

References

Localities of Central Coast Council (Tasmania)
Towns in Tasmania